Shi Runjiu (born 1969), is a Beijing-based Chinese filmmaker.

After graduating from the directing department of the Beijing Central Drama Academy in 1992, he went on to direct many documentaries and music videos for MTV.

He served as assistant director to Zhang Yimou and Lü Yue on their films To Live and Mr. Zhao, respectively. His first feature was A Beautiful New World (Meili Xin Shijie, 1998), a romantic comedy about a peasant who wins an apartment in Shanghai in a lottery.

Shi works for the Imar Film Company, and is a member of the "Sixth Generation" of Chinese filmmakers. He considers his work an exploration of changing Chinese social conventions.

Filmography

External links 

Chinese film directors
1969 births
Living people
Central Academy of Drama alumni